James E. Grunig (born April 18, 1942) is a public relations theorist,   Professor Emeritus for the Department of Communication at the University of Maryland.

Biography

Grunig was born on April 18, 1942.  He received a  B.S. from Iowa State University, 1964 in Agricultural Journalism and a MS from. University of Wisconsin, 1966 in Agricultural Economics. He then received his Ph.D. from the University of Wisconsin–Madison in 1968 with a thesis "Information, entrepreneurship, and economic development : a study of the decision making processes of Colombian latifundistas"  He is married to Larissa A. Grunig,

He was Assistant Professor, Land Tenure Center, University of Wisconsin, 1968–69, and then Assistant Professor(1969–72). Associate Professor (1972-78.) and Full Professor (1978–99), all at the College of Journalism, University of Maryland.   From 1999 until his retirement in 2005 he was Professor in the Department of Communication, University of Maryland; following that, he has been Emeritus Professor in that department.

Work

His theories including the four models of Public Relations:

Grunig has published 250 articles, books, chapters, papers, and reports on public relations. He has received awards and honors from the Public Relations Society of America and the Institute for Public Relations Research.  A Festschrift, "The future of excellence in public relations and communication management: challenges for the next generation" was published to mark his retirement in 2005 

From July through August 2004, he was Wee Kim Wee Professor, School of Communication and Information, Nanyang Technological University, Singapore; from 2000 through 2004  he was Honorary Visiting Professor,  Zhongshan University, Guangzhou, China.

See also
Situational theory of publics   
Situational theory of problem solving

Bibliography

Book written or co-written
Grunig, L. A., Grunig, J. E., & Dozier, D. M. (2002). Excellent public relations and effective organizations: A study of communication management in three countries. Mahwah, NJ: Lawrence Erlbaum Associates, 653 pp.
Dozier, D. M. with Grunig, L. A., & Grunig, J. E. (1995). Manager's Guide to Excellence in Public Relations and Communication Management. Mahwah, NJ: Lawrence Erlbaum Associates, 258 pp.
Hunt, T., & Grunig, J. E. (1994). Public relations techniques. Fort Worth, TX: Harcourt Brace, 417 pp.
Grunig, J. E., & Hunt, T. (2000). Dirección de relaciones públicas. Barcelona, Spain: Gestión 2000. (Spanish translation of Managing public relations.)
Hunt T., & Grunig, J. E. (1995). Tehnike odnosov z javnostmi. Ljubljana, Slovenia: DZS. (Slovenian translation of Public relations techniques.)
Grunig, J. E. & Hunt, T. (1984). Managing public relations. New York: Holt, Rinehart & Winston, 550 pp.

Books edited or coedited
Grunig, J. E. (Ed.) (1992). Excellence in public relations and communication management. Hillsdale, NJ: Lawrence Erlbaum Associates, 666 pp.
Grunig, L. A., & Grunig, J. E. (Eds.) (1991). Public relations research annual (Vol. 3). Hillsdale, NJ: Lawrence Erlbaum Associates, 232 pp.
Grunig, L. A., & Grunig, J. E. (Eds.) (1990). Public relations research annual (Vol. 2). Hillsdale, NJ: Lawrence Erlbaum Associates, 265 pp.
Grunig, J. E., & Grunig, L. A. (Eds.) (1989). Public relations research annual (Vol. 1). Hillsdale, NJ: Lawrence Erlbaum Associates, 223 pp.
Grunig, J. E. (Ed.) (1976). Decline of the global village: How specialization is changing the mass media. Bayside, NY: General Hall, 297 pp.

References
The Handbook of Public Relations (2001).

External links
Faculty bio  - Department of Communication, University of Maryland

Living people
Public relations theorists
University of Maryland, College Park faculty
University of Wisconsin–Madison alumni
American public relations people
1942 births